Yitshak Orpaz (Hebrew:יצחק אוורבוך אורפז) (born 1921 – 14 August 2015) was an Israeli writer.

Biography
Yitzhak Orpaz was born in the Soviet Union. He immigrated to Mandate Palestine at the age of 17. He enlisted in the British Army during the Second World War and served in the Jewish Brigade. He served in the Israel Defense Forces during the 1947–1949 Palestine war. After the war he served in the regular army. He studied philosophy and Hebrew literature at Tel Aviv University.

His first book Wild Grass was published in 1959.

Awards
In 2005, Orpaz was awarded the Israel Prize for literature.

See also
List of Israel Prize recipients

References

External links
Yitzhak Orpaz bibliography at the Institute for Translation of Hebrew Literature.
Israel Prize Official Site - CV of Yitzhak Orpaz-Auerbach 

1923 births
2015 deaths
Jews in Mandatory Palestine
Soviet Jews
Israeli Jews
Soviet emigrants to Mandatory Palestine
Israel Prize in literature recipients
Tel Aviv University alumni
Israeli novelists
Mandatory Palestine military personnel of World War II
International Writing Program alumni
Jewish Brigade personnel
Recipients of Prime Minister's Prize for Hebrew Literary Works